BCEC may refer to:
 Boston Convention and Exhibition Center, the largest exhibition center in the Northeast United States.
 Brisbane Convention & Exhibition Centre, a convention center in Brisbane, Australia.
 Buncombe County Early College, a program at Asheville-Buncombe Technical Community College in Asheville, North Carolina.